Yevhen Ivanyak (born 28 September 1982), is a Ukrainian futsal player who plays for Lokomotiv Kharkiv and the Ukraine national futsal team.

References

External links
UEFA profile

1982 births
Living people
Futsal goalkeepers
Ukrainian men's futsal players
MFC Lokomotyv Kharkiv players
Uragan Ivano-Frankivsk players